The Leopold dtella (Gehyra leopoldi) is a species of gecko, a lizard in the family Gekkonidae. The species is endemic to Southeast Asia and Oceania.

Etymology
The specific name leopoldi, is in honor of Leopold III, King of the Belgians.

Geographic range
G. leopoldi is found in Indonesia and New Guinea.

Reproduction
G. leopoldi is oviparous.

References

Further reading
Brongersma, Leo (1930). "Sur un Geckonidae nouveau, Gehyra leopoldi, nov. sp., de la Nouvelle-Guinée ". Bulletin du Musée royal d'histoire naturelle de Belgique 6 (11): 1–3. (Gehyra leopoldi, new species). (in French).
Chrapliwy, Pete S.; Smith, Hobart M.; Grant, Chapman (1961). "Systematic Status of the Geckonid Lizard Genera Gehyra, Peropus, *Hoplodactylus and Naultinus ". Herpetologica 17 (1): 5–12. (Peropus leopoldi, new combination).
Rösler, Herbert; Glaw, Frank; Günther, Rainer (2005). "Aktualisierte Liste der Geckos von Neuguinea (Sauria: Gekkonidae: Gekkoninae) mit vorläufiger Charakterisierung von neun Formen aus den Gattungen Cyrtodactylus Gray, 1827, Gehyra Gray, 1834 und Nactus Kluge, 1983 ". Gekkota 5: 33–64. (in German, with an abstract in English).

Gehyra
Reptiles described in 1930